Katie Teresa Sheridan is an English actress. She has appeared in feature films such as Heretiks (2018) and Together (2018), and her television roles include appearances in the BBC series Doctors, Waking the Dead and Love Soup. Sheridan first became known for her role as Sophie Norton in the Nickelodeon comedy series Genie in the House.  In 2015 Sheridan created and starred in her own online series, romantic comedy Match Not Found. She was nominated for Best Lead Actor in a web series at the Raindance Film Festival 2016 for this role.

Personal life

Sheridan attended East Berkshire College and Middlesex University. During an appearance on Reel Geek Girls, she talks about her love for Game of Thrones and Harry Potter.

Career
Katie Sheridan made her first television appearance in ITV's real crime series Cracking the Killer's Code, and appeared in a number of BBC productions including Powers, Waking the Dead, In2minds, Casualty, Love Soup, If...TV Goes Down The Tube and Brief Encounters. She also played young Grace in the feature film Lighthouse Hill.

Sheridan gained a following for her role as Sophie Norton in the Nickelodeon comedy series Genie in the House. The show ran for three seasons, with a total of 78 episodes and was shown in over 100 countries. As of March 2012 Genie in the House was aired in the US on the Starz Kids & Family cable network.

Sheridan has appeared in a number of adverts including the 2015 advert for Oral-B toothbrushes and Virgin Trains' "Bound for Glory" campaign. Sheridan also appeared in the Thorntons Christmas and Easter adverts.

Sheridan created, co-wrote and co-produced the online series Match Not Found with British playwright Alex Oates. A romantic comedy, Sheridan plays the luckless in love Kat as the series follows her eventful quest for the right man. She was nominated for Best Lead Actor in a web series at the Raindance Film Festival 2016 for this role, along with the show being screened as part of the festival's Official Selection. Match Not Found was also announced as a finalist in the C21 International Drama Awards for "Best Digital Original Drama", and has had over two million views on YouTube.

Sheridan portrays Sister Margaret in Paul Hyett's horror film Heretiks, which is set in a priory during the 17th century and was filmed on location in Wales. In 2018 Sheridan also played social worker Carol in Together, written and directed by Paul Duddridge, starring Peter Bowles and Sylvia Syms. 

Sheridan appears in Melanie Martinez's musical horror fantasy film K-12 as Lorelei, the disguise used by Cry Baby (Martinez) to seduce the villain Leo.

Filmography

References

External links
 
 
 Katie Sheridan Showreel

Living people
English child actresses
English television actresses
English film actresses
21st-century English actresses
English stage actresses
1986 births